Get to the Feeling is the fourth album by Portland, Oregon-based R&B group Pleasure, released in 1978. It was produced by jazz legend Wayne Henderson of The Crusaders.

Track listing
"Celebrate the Good Things" 	3:26 	
"Foxy Lady" 	3:30 	
"Ladies' Night Out" 	4:38 	
"Happiness" 	3:47 	
"Get to the Feeling" 	4:21 	
"Farewell, Goodbye" 	4:55 	
"Your Love Means Life (Memories)" 	5:02 	
"Thanks for Everything" 	4:23 	
"No Matter What" 	4:55

Personnel
Marlon "The Magician" McClain - Guitar, backing vocals
Michael Hepburn - Keyboards, lead and backing vocals
Donald Hepburn - Keyboards, backing vocals
Nathaniel Phillips - Bass, backing vocals
Sherman Davis - Lead vocals
Bruce Carter - Drums
Bruce Smith - Percussion
Dennis Springer - Soprano saxophone, tenor saxophone

Charts

References

External links
 Pleasure-Get To The Feeling at Discogs

1978 albums
Pleasure (American band) albums
Fantasy Records albums
Albums recorded at Total Experience Recording Studios
Albums produced by Wayne Henderson (musician)